The  Little Ormes Head Quarry tramway was a  narrow gauge industrial railway operating at three levels within the extensive limestone quarry on the Penrhyn Bay side of the Little Orme at Llandudno on the North Wales coast.

Locomotives

See also
 British industrial narrow gauge railways

References 

 

3 ft gauge railways in Wales
Industrial railways in Wales
Railway lines opened in 1889
Railway lines closed in 1931
Llandudno